The Home Affairs Select Committee is a departmental committee of the House of Commons in the Parliament of the United Kingdom.

Remit
The Home Affairs Committee is one of the House of Commons select committees related to government departments: its terms of reference are to examine "the expenditure, administration, and policy of the Home Office and its associated public bodies".

The committee chooses its own subjects of inquiry, within the overall terms of reference. It invites written evidence from interested parties and holds public evidence sessions, usually in committee rooms at the House of Commons, although it does have the power to meet away from Westminster.

At the end of each inquiry, the committee will normally agree on a report based on the evidence received. Such reports are published and made available on the internet. Reports usually contain recommendations to the government and other bodies. By convention,the government responds to reports within about two months of publication. These responses are also published.

Inquiries
Recent inquiries have included:
Brexit-related preparations
Counter-terrorism
Domestic abuse
Hate crime and its violent consequences
Immigration detention
Islamophobia
Modern slavery
Policing for the future
Windrush children

Membership
Diana Johnson was elected chair on 15 December 2021. The members are as follows:

Changes since 2019

2017–2019 Parliament
The chair was elected on 12 July 2017, with the members of the committee being announced on 11 September 2017.

Changes 2017–2019

2015–2017 Parliament
The chair was elected on 18 June 2015, with members being announced on 8 July 2015.

Changes 2015–2017

2010–2015 Parliament
The chair was elected on 10 June 2010, with members being announced on 12 July 2010.

Changes 2010–2015

Changes
Occasionally, the House of Commons orders changes to be made in terms of membership of select committees, as proposed by the Committee of Selection. Such changes are shown below.

Chairs of the Home Affairs Select Committee

Election results
From June 2010 chairs of select committees have been directly elected by a secret ballot of the whole House of Commons using the alternative vote system. Candidates with the fewest votes are eliminated and their votes redistributed until one remaining candidate has more than half of valid votes.
Elections are held at the beginning of a parliament or in the event of a vacancy.

See also
Parliamentary Committees of the United Kingdom

References

External links
Records of the Home Affairs Committee are held at the Parliamentary Archives 
 Home Affairs Committee

Select Committees of the British House of Commons
Home Office (United Kingdom)